Böblingen is an electoral constituency (German: Wahlkreis) represented in the Bundestag. It elects one member via first-past-the-post voting. Under the current constituency numbering system, it is designated as constituency 260. It is located in central Baden-Württemberg, comprising the district of Böblingen.

Böblingen was created for the inaugural 1949 federal election. Since 2017, it has been represented by Marc Biadacz of the Christian Democratic Union (CDU).

Geography
Böblingen is located in central Baden-Württemberg. As of the 2021 federal election, it comprises the entirety of the Böblingen district excluding the municipalities of Steinenbronn, Waldenbuch, and Weissach.

History
Böblingen was created in 1949. In the 1965 through 1976 elections, it was named Leonberg – Vaihingen. In the 1949 election, it was Württemberg-Baden Landesbezirk Württemberg constituency 5 in the numbering system. In the 1953 through 1961 elections, it was number 167. In the 1965 through 1976 elections, it was number 169. In the 1980 through 1998 elections, it was number 164. In the 2002 and 2005 elections, it was number 261. Since the 2009 election, it has been number 260.

Originally, the constituency comprised the districts of Böblingen, Leonberg, and Vaihingen. In the 1965 through 1976 elections, it comprised the districts of Leonberg and Vaihingen as well as the municipalitis of Sindelfingen, Grafenau, and Magstadt from the Böblingen district. In the 1980 through 2002 elections, it was coterminous with the Böblingen district. In the 2005 election, it lost the Steinenbronn and Waldenbuch municipalities. In the 2017 election, it further lost the Weissach municipality.

Members
The constituency has been held by the Christian Democratic Union (CDU) during all but one Bundestag term since its creation. It was first represented by Paul Bausch from 1949 to 1965, followed by Peter Petersen from 1965 to 1972. Hans Geiger of the Social Democratic Party (SPD) was elected in 1972 and served one term. Former member Petersen regained it for the CDU in 1976 and served until 1990. Brigitte Baumeister was representative from 1990 to 2002, followed by Clemens Binninger from 2002 to 2017. Marc Biadacz was elected in 2017 and re-elected in 2021.

Election results

2021 election

2017 election

2013 election

2009 election

References

Federal electoral districts in Baden-Württemberg
1949 establishments in West Germany
Constituencies established in 1949
Böblingen (district)